Vicki Lewis Thompson (born 11 October 1950 in United States) is a best-selling American writer of over seventy romance novels.  She has also been published under the pseudonyms Cory Kenyon and Corey Keaton with Mary Tate Engels.

Biography
Vicki Lewis was born on 11 October 1950 in the United States. She has both a B.A. and M.A. in English from the University of Arizona.  She worked as a journalist and a high school English teacher before deciding that she would try to write romance novels.  Her first book was published in 1984 as the ninth entry in the Harlequin Temptation line.  Thompson also had the honor of being one of the launch authors for the Harlequin Blaze and Harlequin Duets lines.  The first of her "Nerd" Books, Nerd in Shining Armor, was a 2003 Reading With Ripa selection.

Vicki has two children, including daughter Audrey, who runs her mother's website.

Awards
1985 - Romance Writers of America RITA Finalist, Promise Me Sunshine
1986 - Romance Writers of America RITA Finalist, When Angels Dance
1987 - Romance Writers of America RITA Finalist, Butterflies in the Sun
1990 - Romance Writers of America RITA Finalist, Be Mine, Valentine
1992 - Romance Writers of America RITA Finalist, It Happened One Weekend
1996 - Romantic Times Magazine's Reviewers Choice Award Winner, Holding Out for a Hero
1998 - Romance Writers of America RITA Finalist, Mr. Valentine
1999 - Romantic Times Magazine's Reviewers Choice Award Winner, Pure Temptation
2000 - Heart and Scroll Romance Writers of America Madcap Award Winner, Bringing Up Baby New Year
2000 - Romance Writers of America RITA Finalist, Pure Temptation
2002 - Romance Writers of America RITA Finalist, Notorious
2003 - Romantic Times Magazine's Reviewers Choice Award Winner, After Hours
2004 - Heart and Scroll Romance Writers of America Madcap Award Winner, Nerd in Shining Armor
2005 - Heart and Scroll Romance Writers of America Madcap Award Winner, The Nerd Who Loved Me

Bibliography

As Vicki Lewis Thompson

Single Novels
Mingled Hearts (1984)
Promise Me Sunshine (1984)
Impractical Passion (1985)
As Time Goes by (1986)
When Angels Dance (1986)
Butterflies in the Sun (1986)
The Fix It Man (1986)
Cupid's Caper (1987)
Golden Girl (1987)
Sparks (1988)
The Flip Side (1988)
Impulse (1988)
Full Coverage (1989)
Tis the Season (1989)Connections (1989)Your Place or Mine (1991)It Happened One Weekend (1991)Anything Goes (1992)Critical Moves (1992)Ask Dr. Kate (1992)Fools Rush in (1993)Only in the Moonlight (1993)The Bounty Hunter (1994)Loverboy (1994)Under His Spell (1994)Wedding Song (1994)Adam Then and Now (1995)Holding Out for a Hero (1996)Hero in Disguise (1996)Stuck With You (1996)Mr. Valentine (1997)The Heart Breaker (1997)Going Overboard (1997)Santa in Stetson (1997)One Mom Too Many (1997)Manhunting in Montana (1998)Operation Gigolo (1998)Single in the Saddle (1998)Pure Temptation (1999)Single, Sexy... and Sold! (1999)Bachelor Father (1999)Every Woman's Fantasy (2001)Boone's Bounty (2001)The Nights Before Christmas (2001)Acting on Impulse (2002)Truly, Madly, Deeply (2002)Double Exposure (2002)After Hours (2003)Her Best Friend's Baby (2003)Old Enough to Know Better (2004)Killer Cowboy Charm (2004)Talking about Sex... (2005)

 Nerds Nerd in Shining Armor (2003)The Nerd Who Loved Me (2004)Nerd Gone Wild (2005)Gone With the Nerd (2005)Talk Nerdy to Me (2006)Nerds Like It Hot (2006)My Nerdy Valentine (2007)Nerds Are From Mars (2013)

 Wild About You 

 Sons of Chance 

 Babes on Brooms 
 Blonde with a Wand (2010)
 Chick with a Charm (2010)

 Hex Over Hexed (2007)Wild and Hexy (2008)Casual Hex (2009)

 Thunder Mountain Brotherhood 
 Midnight Thunder (2015)
 Thunderstruck (2015)
 Rolling Like Thunder (2015)
 A Cowboy Under the Mistletoe (2015)
 Cowboy All Night (2016)
 Cowboy After Dark (2016)
 Cowboy Untamed (2016)
 Cowboy Unwrapped (2016)
 In the Cowboys Arms (2017)
 Say Yes to the Cowboy (2017)
 Do You Take This Cowboy? (2017)

 Branscom Sisters 

 The Buckskin Brotherhood 

 Sweet-Talking Cowboy (2020)
 Big-Hearted Cowboy (2020)
 Baby-Daddy Cowboy (2020)
 True-Blue Cowboy (2020)
 Strong-Willed Cowboy (2020)
 Secret-Santa Cowboy (2020)

 Three Cowboys And a Baby The Colorado Kid (2000)Two in the Saddle (2000)Boone's Bounty (2000)That's My Baby! (2000)

 Sexy Texans 
 Crazy for the Cowboy (2015)
 Wild About the Wrangler (2015)

 Urban Cowboy Series 
 The Trailblazer (1995)
 The Drifter (1995)
 The Lawman (1995)

 Charlie Hartmann Valentine 
 Be Mine, Valentine (1989)
 Forever Mine, Valentine (1990)

 McGavin Brothers 

 The Nerds and Geeks of BMUS 

Drive MeDrive Me Wild (2003)Drive Me Crazy (2003)

Perfect Man

 Vintage VLT 

 Mingled Hearts (2014)
 As Time Goes By (2014)
 'Tis the Season (2014)
 The Fix-It Man'' (2015)

 As Cory Kenyon 

 As Corey Keaton 

 Anthologies and Collections 

References and Resources
Vicki Lewis Thompson's Official Website
Vicki Lewis Thompson's Profile from Best Reviews
Vicki Lewis Thompson's Webpage in Harlequin Enterprises Ltd's Website
Vicki Lewis Thompson's Webpage in Fantastic Fiction's Website
Blog of Vicki Lewis Thompson, Jennifer LaBrecque, and Rhonda NelsonSpecific'''

20th-century American novelists
21st-century American novelists
American romantic fiction writers
University of Arizona alumni
Living people
American women novelists
Women romantic fiction writers
20th-century American women writers
21st-century American women writers
1950 births